Tongyu is a county in the northwest of Jilin province, China, bordering Inner Mongolia to the south and west.

The town of Tongyu can be considered to include the areas of Kaitong and Yangjing described below.

Administrative divisions

There are eight towns, eight townships, and two ethnic townships under the county's administration.

Towns:
Kaitong, Zhanyu, Shuanggang, Xinglongshan, Bianzhao, Hongxing, Xinhua, Wulanhua

Townships:
Yangjing Township, Yongqing Township, Xinfa Township, Xinxing Township, Tuanjie Township, Shihuadao Township, Bamian Township, Sugongtuo Township, Xianghai Mongol Ethnic Township, Baolawendu Mongol Ethnic Township

Climate

References

External links

County-level divisions of Jilin